Texas tea or Texas TEA may refer to:

Petroleum, crude oil drilled from the Earth
A variation of Long Island Iced Tea, a mixed drink made primarily of a high concentration of alcoholic ingredients and whisky, without any actual iced tea
Purple Drank, a drug composed of Sprite and prescription cough syrup
A video slot machine themed around the Texas oil industry
 fertilizer water filtered through manure then given to plants.
 A live-action episode of The Super Mario Bros. Super Show!
 The Texas Education Agency (TEA)

See also
Texas T